Wojciech Małecki (born 11 October 1990) is a Polish former goalkeeper.

References

External links
Wojciech Małecki at Soccerway

1990 births
Living people
People from Elbląg
Polish footballers
Association football goalkeepers
Ekstraklasa players
Jagiellonia Białystok players
Korona Kielce players
Znicz Pruszków players
Kotwica Kołobrzeg footballers
Górnik Łęczna players
KTS Weszło Warsaw players
Sportspeople from Warmian-Masurian Voivodeship